Dimecoenia is a genus of shore flies in the family Ephydridae.

Species

D. abrupta Cresson, 1935
D. caesia (Wulp, 1883)
D. carrerai Oliveira, 1957
D. chilensis (Macquart, 1850)
D. ciligena (Rondani, 1868)
D. coltaensis Cresson, 1935
D. densepilosa (Hendel, 1930)
D. fuscifemur Steyskal, 1970
D. gilvipes (Coquillett, 1901)
D. grumanni Oliveira, 1954
D. lenti Oliveira, 1954
D. lopesi Oliveira, 1954
D. prionoptera (Thomson, 1869)
D. spinosa (Loew, 1864)
D. travassosi Mello & Oliveira, 1992
D. tristanensis Frey, 1954
D. venteli Oliveira, 1954
D. zurcheri Hendel, 1933

References

Ephydridae
Taxa named by Ezra Townsend Cresson
Diptera of North America
Diptera of South America
Brachycera genera